Robert Perciasepe  is an American former government official who currently serves as a senior adviser of the nonprofit Center for Climate and Energy Solutions, following his role as President of the organization. He served as the Deputy Administrator and Acting Administrator of the U.S. Environmental Protection Agency during the administration of Barack Obama.

Prior to joining the Obama administration, Perciasepe was Chief Operating Officer for the environmental conservation non-profit National Audubon Society. Before that, he served in the administration of President Bill Clinton as the EPA's Assistant Administrator for clean water and then later as the Assistant Administrator for clean air.

Prior to that time he served as Maryland's Secretary of the Environment after holding the positions of Chief of Capital Planning and Assistant Director for Planning for the city of Baltimore.

Early life and career
Born in New Rochelle, New York, Perciasepe was raised in Brewster, New York and later Ancram, New York. He attended Immaculate High School in Danbury, Connecticut, graduating in 1969. In 1974 he graduated from Cornell University with a Bachelor of Science in natural resources and in 1976 received his Master's Degree in Planning and Public Administration from the Maxwell School of Citizenship and Public Affairs at Syracuse University.

After graduation, Perciasepe began working in the Baltimore City Planning Department (1976–80), where he later served as Chief of Capital Planning (1980–86) and as Assistant Director for Planning (1986–87). In 1987, Perciasepe joined the Maryland Department of the Environment (MDE), serving as Assistant Secretary of Planning and Capital Programs until 1989, when he was appointed Deputy Secretary of the full Department by then Maryland Governor William Donald Schaefer.

In 1987, Governor Schaefer appointed Martin Walsh as the first Secretary of the Environment.

After Governor Schaefer was re-elected in 1990, he announced that he would "reorganize his administration," appointing Perciasepe to be Walsh's replacement as Maryland's Secretary of the Environment, thus making Perciasepe the second Secretary of MDE.

During his tenure as Secretary of the Environment, Perciasepe oversaw the agency's $59 million budget and 770 employees. While there, he took actions that included re-evaluating the Chesapeake Bay Program's efforts to reduce harmful nutrients, chairing the Northeast Ozone Transport Commission for cleaner regional air quality, reducing emissions from cars, and initiating new recycling requirements.

Early EPA career
In 1993, President Clinton appointed Perciasepe to serve as EPA's Assistant Administrator for Water. While in that job, Perciasepe guided development of the Clean Water Action Plan for slowing wetlands loss.

Perciasepe headed the Clinton Administration's engagement with the U.S. Congress in support of passage of new amendments to strengthen the nation's Safe Drinking Water Act - amendments signed into law by President Clinton on August 6, 1996. He was in charge of implementing the new provisions set forth under those amendments, which included setting more protective health standards for drinking water quality, expanding citizen right-to-know information about the quality of their tap water, and improving local infrastructure through a new multibillion-dollar state revolving loan fund.

In 1998, President Clinton appointed Perciasepe to become the EPA's Assistant Administrator for Air and Radiation.

While head of EPA's clean air program, he took action to reduce harmful emissions from cars and heavy duty trucks by requiring reduced sulfur content in gasoline and diesel fuel. He oversaw initial findings on the need to reduce levels of mercury emitted by power plants. And he worked to ensure that EPA standards for any potential nuclear waste repository – for instance, such as the one once proposed for Yucca Mountain – will be protective of human health.

National Audubon Society
After leaving the Clinton Administration in 2001, Perciasepe joined the National Audubon Society as Senior Vice President for Public Policy and head of the Washington, DC, office. In 2004, he was named Chief Operating Officer of the Society, where he coordinated efforts to protect wetlands. While there, Perciasepe also worked with the Board of Directors to establish Audubon Centers in urban areas like Columbus, Dallas and Phoenix to expand access to nature education in underserved communities.

Deputy Administrator of the EPA

On May 18, 2009, President Barack Obama announced his intentions to nominate Perciasepe as Deputy Administrator of the Environmental Protection Agency and the official nomination came one month later. Perciasepe was confirmed by the Senate on December 24, 2009, becoming the Agency's Deputy Administrator.

On February 15, 2013, EPA Administrator Lisa P. Jackson resigned from her post and Perciasepe was named Acting Administrator in addition to his Deputy role. On July 19, 2013, EPA Administrator Gina McCarthy was sworn in, and Perciasepe resumed his role as Deputy Administrator.

He became president of the Center for Climate and Energy Solutions (C2ES) on August 11, 2014, and served as president until 2021. Perciasepe now serves as a senior adviser on climate change to a limited number of institutions including C2ES. He also serves on a number of non-profit boards.

References

External links

Perciasepe biography

|-

1951 births
Administrators of the United States Environmental Protection Agency
American chief operating officers
Clinton administration personnel
Cornell University College of Agriculture and Life Sciences alumni
Living people
Maryland Democrats
Obama administration cabinet members
21st-century American politicians
People from Brewster, New York
Politicians from New Rochelle, New York
Politicians from Baltimore
State cabinet secretaries of Maryland
Maxwell School of Citizenship and Public Affairs alumni